Lina Lundqvist (born 8 January 1993) is a Swedish footballer goalkeeper who plays for Gamla Upsala. She previously played for Kvarnsvedens IK.

References

External links 
 
 

1993 births
Living people
Swedish women's footballers
IK Sirius Fotboll players
QBIK players
Damallsvenskan players
Women's association football goalkeepers
Kvarnsvedens IK players
IK Uppsala Fotboll players
IFK Kalmar players